Johann Lienhart (born 17 July 1960) is an Austrian former cyclist. He competed at the 1980, 1984 and 1988 Summer Olympics. He won the Austrian National Road Race Championships in 1983.

References

External links
 

1960 births
Living people
Austrian male cyclists
Olympic cyclists of Austria
Cyclists at the 1980 Summer Olympics
Cyclists at the 1984 Summer Olympics
Cyclists at the 1988 Summer Olympics
People from Südoststeiermark District
Sportspeople from Styria
20th-century Austrian people